Alphomelon is a genus of braconid wasps in the family Braconidae. There are at least 19 described species in Alphomelon, found in North, Central, and South America.

Species
These species belong to the genus Alphomelon:

 Alphomelon arecaphile Deans, 2003
 Alphomelon brachymacher Deans, 2003
 Alphomelon brasiliensis Shimabukuro & Penteado-Dias, 2003
 Alphomelon bromeliphile Deans, 2003
 Alphomelon citroloma Deans, 2003
 Alphomelon conforme (Muesebeck, 1958)
 Alphomelon crocostethus Deans, 2003
 Alphomelon disputabile (Ashmead, 1900)
 Alphomelon melanoscelis Deans, 2003
 Alphomelon nanosoma Deans, 2003
 Alphomelon nigriceps (Ashmead, 1900)
 Alphomelon paurogenum Deans, 2003
 Alphomelon pyrrhogluteum Deans, 2003
 Alphomelon rhyssocercus Deans, 2003
 Alphomelon rugosum Shimabukuro & Penteado-Dias, 2003
 Alphomelon simpsonorum Deans, 2003
 Alphomelon talidicida (Wilkinson, 1931)
 Alphomelon winniewertzae Deans, 2003
 Alphomelon xestopyga Deans, 2003

References

Further reading

 
 
 

Microgastrinae